Nanditha Raj is an Indian actress. She made her debut in the Telugu film industry with the film Neeku Naaku Dash Dash, directed by Teja. She rose to prominence with the success of her second film Prema Katha Chitram, which earned her a Filmfare Award for Best Actress nomination.

Personal life 

Nanditha was born in Mumbai and raised in Delhi. Her father, Colonel Raj Kumar, is an army officer. He is from Hyderabad, while her mother, a legal advisor, is from Visakhapatnam. Nanditha can speak English, Hindi and Telugu. She studied in various army schools, including Army Public School (R.K. Puram), she graduated with a B.Com. degree from St. Francis College, Hyderabad. And graduated in MBA distance from symbiosis, Pune 

After winning a beauty contest she started her acting career. Though she didn't plan her career in entertainment industry it was her mother who encouraged her to take up modeling as a career.

Career 

Nanditha started her film career with Neeku Naaku Dash Dash under the direction of Teja in 2012. She was reportedly selected for the role from a statewide hunt where she beat around 70,000 other aspirants. Her second film Prema Katha Chitram, with Sudheer Babu as her co-star, released on 7 June 2013. She played a hotel management student in the film, who is a big fan of a renowned dancer (Sudheer Babu). 123telugu.com wrote "Nandhita is the real star of the film. She is simply brilliant. There are certain sequences where she is required to exhibit dramatic changes in behaviour and she has excelled in those scenes". It became a box-office blockbuster. She was next seen in a Malayalam film London Bridge with Prithviraj Sukumaran. She played a Malayali girl in the film who goes to London for a job, and falls in love with the character played by Prithviraj.

Filmography 
 All films are in Telugu, Otherwise noted.

References

External links
 

Living people
Actresses from Mumbai
Actresses in Telugu cinema
Actresses in Malayalam cinema
Indian film actresses
21st-century Indian actresses
Telugu actresses
Year of birth missing (living people)